Sir Henry Percy Harris KBE (8 September 1856 - 23 August 1941) was a British Conservative Party politician who served first on the London County Council, and then as a Member of Parliament.

Henry Percy Harris was born on 8 September 1856, the son of Sir George David Harris, a member of the London County Council from its creation on January 1889. Henry Harris was educated at Eton College and Christ Church, Oxford University, before qualifying as a barrister in 1881.

Like his father, Henry Harris served on the London County Council, he representing Paddington from 1892 to 1910. He was deputy chairman of the Council between 1898–1899 and chairman between 1907–1908. He was among the Council group allied to the Conservative Party, first known as the Moderate Party then, from 1906, the Municipal Reform Party. From 1904 he led the group and later became chairman of the related London Municipal Society.

Harris was elected as Conservative and Unionist Member of Parliament (MP) for Paddington South at the general elections of January and December 1910. In the 1918 general election he stood as a Conservative supporter of David Lloyd George's coalition Government and was re-elected unopposed. He then retired from Parliament and did not contest the 1922 general election.

In 1917 he was made a Knight Commander (KBE) of the Order of the British Empire for his services as Chairman of the London War Pensions Committee.

He died on 23 August 1941 at the age of 84.

References

External links 
 
 

1856 births
1941 deaths
People educated at Eton College
Alumni of Christ Church, Oxford
Members of London County Council
Conservative Party (UK) MPs for English constituencies
UK MPs 1910
UK MPs 1910–1918
UK MPs 1918–1922
Politics of London